Ebrahimabad (also Romanized as Ebrāhīmābād) is a village in Anzan-e Sharqi Rural District, in the Central District of Bandar-e Gaz County, Golestan Province, Iran. At the 2006 census, its population was 783, in 168 families.

References 

Populated places in Bandar-e Gaz County